Andaman may refer to:

 Andaman Islands
 Andaman Sea
 Andaman (1998 film), a Kannada-language film
 Andaman (2016 film), a Tamil-language film
 Andaman (2021 film), a Hindi-language film

See also 
 Andaman and Nicobar Islands
 Andamanese languages
 Andaman Discoveries, a social enterprise in Thailand